Douglas M. Gabram is a retired United States Army lieutenant general who last served as the Commanding General of the United States Army Installation Management Command. Previously, he served as the Director for Test of the Missile Defense Agency.

Awards and decorations

References

Living people
Place of birth missing (living people)
Recipients of the Distinguished Service Medal (US Army)
Recipients of the Legion of Merit
United States Army generals
United States Army personnel of the Gulf War
United States Army personnel of the Iraq War
United States Army personnel of the War in Afghanistan (2001–2021)
Year of birth missing (living people)